A/L iwarai (Sinhala: ඒ ලෙවල් ඉවරය) is a Sri Lankan television drama broadcast by Sri Lanka Rupavahini Corporation.
A/L iwarai written & directed by Lakmini Amaradeva and this is the most popular teledrama at 7:30pm.

Music
Music directed by Ravihans Wetakepotha.
Man Game Kolla Sinhala:මං ගමේ කොල්ලා is the most famous song in this teledrama.

See also
Sri Lanka Rupavahini Corporation

References  

Sri Lankan television shows
Sri Lankan drama television series
2013 Sri Lankan television series debuts
2013 Sri Lankan television series endings
2010s Sri Lankan television series
Sri Lanka Rupavahini Corporation original programming